Álvaro Ferrer Vecilla (born 17 March 1982) was a Spanish handball player. He has played more than 400 matches in Liga ASOBAL.

References

External links 
 

1982 births
Living people
Sportspeople from Granollers
Spanish male handball players
Handball players from Catalonia
Liga ASOBAL players
BM Granollers players
CB Ademar León players
BM Aragón players
Expatriate handball players
Spanish expatriate sportspeople in Portugal
Spanish expatriate sportspeople in Germany